Paradise Valley (Alberta) is the valley between Highwood Ridge and Grizzly Ridge just west of the Highwood Pass in Kananaskis Country, Alberta, Canada.

Paradise Valley, along with the Highwood valley to its east and an unnamed valley to the west form the headwaters of the Highwood River.

Kananaskis Improvement District
Valleys of Alberta